Non Stop Ecstatic Dancing is a 'mini' or 'remix' album by English synth-pop duo Soft Cell, released in the United Kingdom in June 1982, by Some Bizzare Records. In addition to remixes of the group's older material, it included a brand-new track, a cover of Judy Street's 1966 song "What", which reached number three on the UK Singles Chart. In some territories the album was released as an EP.

As the name implies, Non Stop Ecstatic Dancing was conceived, by the band's own admission, under the influence of MDMA (commonly referred to as ecstasy). Vocalist Marc Almond later said in an interview with journalist Simon Tebbutt that the album's sound, as well as the sound of the band, was influenced by a short stint working at The Warehouse, a popular nightclub in Leeds. The album is more dance-oriented than the group's first album Non-Stop Erotic Cabaret, with remixes and instrumental versions of two songs from its predecessor, and both sides of the Memorabilia single, as well as the new track "What". In the United Kingdom, this mini-LP format was just becoming prominent. Subsequent reissues would see the original mini-album length track listing bolstered with several extended versions of other Soft Cell material of the period.

Originally, the album was set to be produced by Donald Fagen of Steely Dan, and several tracks co-written by him were recorded, but those songs were shelved due to label disputes with MCA Records. The whole album had to be scrapped due to songwriting liabilities and Soft Cell famously had to write and record the album in the span of one week.

The band went on hiatus for a small period of time after the album's release, with David Ball taking time to reconcile with his girlfriend and Almond performing with Marc and the Mambas. This fuelled rumours that the band was splitting up, though they would release two more albums, The Art of Falling Apart (1983) and This Last Night in Sodom (1984).

Reception

In a contemporary review, Ken Tucker of The Philadelphia Inquirer gave the release a one star rating out of five, declaring it "more sterile English dance music" and that the release was "more of the same junk. And I do mean same: Two of the cuts here are simply re-recorded versions of previously released material."

Track listing

Notes
 "Memorabilia" appears here as a brand-new version of the B-side of "A Man Can Get Lost", performed in duet with Cindy Ecstasy.
 "Where Did Our Love Go" is a remix of the B-side of "Tainted Love".
 "A Man Could Get Lost" and "Chips on My Shoulder" are heavily remixed instrumental versions of the original songs.
 "Sex Dwarf" is also remixed, but is closer to the structure of the original song.
 The original North American vinyl release replaced "Chips on My Shoulder" with an edit of the extended version of "Insecure...Me?", while the 1999 remastered CD reissue contained both tracks.

Personnel
Credits adapted from the liner notes of Non Stop Ecstatic Dancing.

Soft Cell
 David Ball
 Marc Almond

Additional musicians
 Cindy Ecstasy – rap
 David Tofani – tenor saxophone
 John Gatchell – trumpet, flugelhorn

Technical
 Mike Thorne – production
 Don Wershba – engineering
 Nicky Kalliongis – engineering assistance
 Harvey Goldberg – mixing
 Jack Skinner – cutting engineer

Artwork
 Peter Ashworth – front photo
 Josh – back photo
 Huw Feather – design
 M.T. 9 – artwork

Charts

Certifications

References

1982 EPs
1982 remix albums
Albums produced by Mike Thorne
Soft Cell albums
Some Bizzare Records EPs